"Flower Shower" (stylized in all caps) is a song recorded by South Korean singer-songwriter Hyuna, released on November 5, 2019, by P Nation and distributed by Kakao M as a single. The music video was released on the same day. "Flower Shower" was Hyuna’s first release with P Nation after her departure from her former agency Cube Entertainment. The song was later included in Hyuna's seventh EP I'm Not Cool.

Composition
The song was written and produced by Psy. It was mainly composed in C major, apart from the chorus, and it is in a tempo of 100 bpm.

Promotion
Hyuna promoted the song on several music programs in South Korea including M Countdown, Show! Music Core and Inkigayo.

Chart performance
"Flower Shower" debuted at number 71 on the South Korean Gaon Digital Chart and the next week the song peaked at number 54. In the US, the song also debuted at number 6 on the Billboard World Digital Song Sales with 1,000 downloads sold.

Music video
The music video teaser was released on November 4. The official music video was released on November 5. The dance practice was released on November 8.

Credits and personnel
 Hyuna – vocals, songwriting, producer
 Psy – songwriting, producer
 Yu Geon-hyeong – producer
 Space One – producer
 Anna Timgren – producer

Charts

Weekly charts

Release history

References 

2019 songs
2019 singles
Hyuna songs
Songs written by Psy
Songs written by Hyuna